John Williams (27 May 1946 – 12 August 1978) was an English motorcycle short-circuit road racer who also entered selected Grands Prix on the near-continent. He mostly raced as a "privateer" having a personal sponsor, Gerald Brown. Williams died in Northern Ireland, following an accident when racing at an event held on closed public roads near Dundrod.

Career
Williams began racing in 1966, and won the Stars of Tomorrow meeting at Brands Hatch in 1968 on a 250 cc Ducati. He turned professional in 1973, and won the 250, 350 and 500 cc classes at that year's Ulster Grand Prix, the first rider to win three Ulster GP races in a single day. In 1974 he won the 350cc, 500cc and 750cc classes at the North West 200, marking the first time a competitor had won three classes at the event. He also raced for Honda in endurance events such as the Bol d'Or.
 
His best season was in 1975 when he finished in fifth place in the 500 cc world championship on a Yamaha motorcycle. Williams won his only world championship race when he defeated Barry Sheene at the 1976 Belgian Grand Prix. Sadly, having led the race throughout, he ran out of petrol within sight of the chequered flag, pushing his bike across the line to finish seventh. Williams was named as Sports Personality of the Year for 1976 by the Liverpool Echo.

Williams turned down the offer of a place on the factory-backed Texaco Heron Suzuki team in 1977, preferring to race as a privateer, although well-publicised differences between himself and Barry Sheene may have been a contributing factor.

He was a five-time winner of the North West 200 race in Northern Ireland and a four-time winner at the Isle of Man TT.

Williams won the 500 cc race in the 1978 Ulster Grand Prix, but died from injuries suffered after crashing at Wheeler's Corner in the inaugural TT Formula One event later that same day. He was a resident of Heswall, a town on the Wirral, Merseyside, England.

John Williams Trophy
The John Williams Trophy is an annual award at the Isle of Man TT Races. It is presented to the rider who completes the fastest lap in the Superbike TT race.

Motorcycle Grand Prix results
Points system from 1969 onwards:

(key) (Races in bold indicate pole position; races in italics indicate fastest lap)

References

1946 births
1978 deaths
People from Cheshire
People from Heswall
English motorcycle racers
250cc World Championship riders
350cc World Championship riders
500cc World Championship riders
Isle of Man TT riders
Motorcycle racers who died while racing
Sport deaths in Northern Ireland